The Enigma Variations is a compilation album of newer artists (in 1985) that were on Enigma Records or one of its subsidiaries.  It was originally released as a double LP and cassette, but was then subsequently also released as a CD with a reduced number of tracks.  The album was compiled by Steve Pross and William Hein. The Greek pressing of the album (on Virgin Records) was issued as a single LP.

A second compilation, The Enigma Variations 2, was released in 1987.

Reception
"Despite its lack of success with EMI, Enigma has continued to put out new records including the current two record set "The Enigma Variations", the budget priced compilation which takes its name from a composition by Sir Edward Elgar offers 26 songs including several unreleased tracks by such stellar bands as Red Kross, the Leaving Trains, Green on Red, the Untouchables, the Screaming Sirens, the Effigies, TSOL and Cathedral of Tears. The label plans to follow up this release next month with a country compilation." (Patrick Goldstein, Los Angeles Times, 1985) 
"If this is not the best compilation album ever, it is only because volume two is just as good. This is alternative rock when it was really alternative. If any of these songs were sung by R.E.M., Nirvana, Pearl Jam or Coldplay, you would hear them every week on the radio, but now they are forgotten."  (JT Fournier, epinions, 2006)

Track listing

The Enigma Variations

Greek Vinyl edition

References

External links

Listing on Get Smart! site
Nothin' Sez Somethin'
Rate Your Music

1985 compilation albums
Enigma Records albums
Post-punk compilation albums
Virgin Records compilation albums
Record label compilation albums